Cotabato, also known as the Province of Cotabato  (Maguindanaon: Kutawatu,   كوتاواتو), was a historical province of the Philippines established in 1914 that existed until its dissolution in 1973. The province's capital from 1920–1967 was Cotabato City (of the same name) while Pagalungan became its capital from 1967–1973.

Originally a district of the former Moro Province, on September 1, 1914, the defunct Department of Mindanao and Sulu provided with autonomous government through Act No. 2408 enacted on July 23, 1914, converted the district into a province along with other former Moro Province districts: Davao, Lanao, Sulu, Zamboanga, and its former sub-province Bukidnon. Davao, Lanao and Zamboanga were then later split and partitioned into different current provinces while Sulu and Bukidnon remain what it is today.

It was dissolved on 1973, comprising what are now the provinces of Cotabato (North), South Cotabato, Maguindanao del Norte, Maguindanao del Sur,  Sultan Kudarat, and Sarangani.

History

Establishment and composition

Upon its separation from the Department of Mindanao and Sulu, Cotabato comprised the municipalities of Cotabato (the provincial capital), Dulawan, and Midsayap, and the following municipal districts:

 Awang
 Balatikan
 Balut
 Banisilan
 Barira
 Buayan
 Bugasan
 Buldun
 Buluan
 Carmen
 Daguma
 Dinaig
 Dulawan
 Gambar
 Glan
 Isulan
 Kabakan
 Kalanganan
 Kiamba
 Kidapawan
 Kitubud
 Kling
 Koronadal
 Lebak
 Libuangan
 Liguasan
 Maganui
 Nuling
 Parang
 Pikit-Pagalungan
 Reina Regente
 Salaman
 Sebu
 Silik
 Subpangan
 Talayan
 Tumbau

On June 18, 1966, South Cotabato was separated from the province through Republic Act No. 4849. That very same day, the provincial capital was moved from Cotabato City to Pagalungan.

Dissolution
On November 22, 1973, the remaining territories of the Province of Cotabato was divided into North Cotabato, Maguindanao and Sultan Kudarat through Presidential Decree No. 341.

On March 7, 1984, North Cotabato was renamed to simply "Cotabato" through Batas Pambansa Blg. 660.

On March 16, 1992, the province of Sarangani was formed out of South Cotabato.

See also
 Islam in the Philippines

References

Former provinces of the Philippines
States and territories established in 1914
1914 establishments in the Philippines
States and territories disestablished in 1973